Domenico Grimani (19 February 1461 – 27 August 1523) was an Italian nobleman, theologian  and cardinal. Like most noble churchman of his era Grimani was an ecclesiastical pluralist, holding numerous posts and benefices. Desiderius Erasmus dedicated to Grimani his Musica.

Biography
Born in Venice, he was the eldest of five sons of Antonio Grimani, the oldest elected Doge of Venice, and his wife Catarina Loredan. Antonio was elected doge in 1521, when Domenico was already a cardinal.

He exhibited an early predilection for humanist studies, which was encouraged by  teachers in his native Venice and then in the ambit of the Medicean academy in Florence, where he moved in the circle of Lorenzo de' Medici among scholars like Pico della Mirandola and Poliziano. He obtained a doctorate in canon law at the University of Padua on 23 October 1487 and was elected a Senator of Venice that same year.

He became a cardinal in 1493, an appointment paid by his father with a sum of around 25,000/30,000 ducats.  Grimani was not ordained a priest until 1498.  After the election of Pope Julius II he became cardinal priest of San Marco.

After a period as apostolic administrator in Nicosia, starting from 1498 he was Patriarch of Aquileia, a position he abandoned in favor of his nephew Marino (later also cardinal) in 1517. In 1508 he was named cardinal bishop of Albano, and was  also administrator of the diocese of Urbino (from 1514) and  bishop of Ceneda (1517-1520).  Grimani was already ill in the 1521 conclave, and died one year and a half later; he was buried in the church of Santi Giovanni e Paolo, Rome, but later his remains were moved to San Francesco della Vigna.

Legacy
Grimani was a large collector, owning works by artists such as Leonardo da Vinci, Giorgione, Titian, Hans Memling, Hieronymus Bosch, Raphael and others: his collection now forms part of the Museo d'Antichità in the Doge's Palace in Venice, while several of his codexes are in the Archbishop's Library at Udine.  The Grimani Breviary, now in the Biblioteca Marciana of Venice, is a key work in the late history of Flemish illuminated manuscripts.  It was produced in Ghent and Bruges ca 1515-1520 and by 1520 owned, though possibly not originally commissioned, by Domenico Grimani. Several leading artists, including Simon Bening and Gerard David contributed some of their finest work to it.

Grimani also wrote several theological treatises, and translated John Chrysostom's homilies.

References

External links
 

1461 births
1523 deaths
Domenico
16th-century Roman Catholic bishops in the Republic of Venice
Patriarchs of Aquileia
16th-century Italian cardinals
Cardinals created by Pope Alexander VI
Cardinal-bishops of Albano
Cardinal-bishops of Frascati
Cardinal-bishops of Porto
15th-century Roman Catholic archbishops in Cyprus